Charlotte (28 June 1444 –  16 July 1487) was the Queen of Cyprus from 1458 until 1464. She was the eldest and only surviving daughter of King John II of Cyprus and Helena Palaiologina. At the age of 14, she succeeded to the Cypriot throne upon the death of her father. Her illegitimate half-brother, James, challenged her right to the crown. With the support of the Egyptians, he forced her to flee the island in 1463, and he was later crowned king. She made a military attempt to regain her throne, but was unsuccessful, and died childless in Rome.

Family and childhood

Charlotte was born in Nicosia on 28 June 1444, the eldest and only surviving daughter of King John II of Cyprus and Helena Palaiologina. Her younger sister Cleopha died in June 1448, shortly before Charlotte's fourth birthday, leaving her the sole legitimate heir to the Cypriot throne and her father's titles. She had an illegitimate half-brother, James, born to her father's Greek mistress Marietta de Patras.

She was raised in the Byzantine tradition and spoke fluent Greek, which she learned from her mother. She could write French, Italian, and possibly Latin, but throughout her life spoke mainly Greek. Due to her outspoken manner, Pope Pius II called her the "Greek torrent".

Queen of Cyprus

Charlotte was named Princess of Antioch in 1456. The same year she married her first husband, John of Portugal. She was widowed in 1457, and on 28 July 1458 her father died. At the age of fourteen Charlotte became Queen of Cyprus and was crowned at St. Sophia Cathedral on 7 October 1458.

Charlotte's reign was not successful. She had a tenuous hold on the kingdom as her right to the throne was constantly being challenged by her illegitimate half-brother James. On 7 October 1459, she married her second husband, Louis of Savoy, Count of Geneva. This marriage had been arranged by the Genoese who promised their assistance in retaining her crown against the claims by James.

In 1460 he managed to capture Famagusta and Nicosia with aid from the Egyptian sultanate of Sayf ad-Din Inal. After being blockaded in the castle of Kyrenia for three years, she and Louis fled to Rome in 1463, whereupon her half-brother was crowned King James II. She took up residence at the Convertendi Palace in Trastevere. Pope Pius II, who was acquainted with her described Charlotte as "a woman of about twenty-four, of middle height: bright eyes, complexion betwixt dark and pale; speech smooth and flowing torrent like after the manner of the Greeks; French costume; manners becoming her royal blood".

She later formed a small court on the Greek island of Rhodes. She made an unsuccessful military attempt to regain her throne with papal support. She also intrigued against James's widow, Catherine Cornaro, but failed to oust her from power. In November 1483 she was received by Pope Sixtus IV in the Vatican Palace and was seated in a chair of the same "height and dignity" as the pope. In Rome, she lived in a house in Piazza Scossacavalli in Borgo which had already hosted queen Catherine of Bosnia.

Succession and death 
She had adopted as her son, Alonso d'Aragona (1460–1510), the illegitimate child of King Ferdinand I of Naples, who was either married or engaged to her half-brother's illegitimate daughter, Charla de Lusignan, b. 24 July 1468. Charlotte had intended to maintain the continuity of the dynasty through her niece, and circa 1473, accompanied by Alonso, she visited Sultan Al-Asraf Khalil in Cairo to discuss a possible restoration to the throne. Al-Asraf supported Charlotte's cause, still the plan could not be carried out until she had custody of young Charla. The former queen's opponents ensured this would never happen by imprisoning the little girl in Padua, she died there before her twelfth birthday in 1480. Afterwards, a marriage was suggested between Alonso and Catherine Conaro, but this also failed due to the interference of the Republic of Venice. Instead, around February 1485, in exchange for an annual pension of 4,300 florins, Charlotte ceded her claims to her cousin's son, Charles I of Savoy, the next in the legitimate line of succession.

Charlotte died childless on 16 July 1487, shortly after her forty-third birthday. Her body is buried in the chapel of Saint Andrew and Saint Gregory, St. Peter's Basilica; the funeral was paid for by Pope Innocent VIII. She was the last member of the House of Poitiers-Lusignan.

Marriages
Charlotte married twice:
  Infante John of Portugal, also known as John of Coimbra, (1431 or 1433 – between July and 11 September 1457) (son of Infante Pedro, Duke of Coimbra and grandson of King John I of Portugal), in May 1456 in Nicosia. He was made a titular Prince of Antioch. It is rumoured that his death was a murder due to poisoning, arranged by Queen Helena, leaving Charlotte free to make a second marriage.
  Louis of Savoy, Count of Geneva (Geneva, 5 June 1436 or 1 April 1437 – Château-Monastery de Ripaille, August 1482). The couple were married on 7 October 1459, almost a year after Charlotte's coronation. Louis was her cousin: he was the second son and namesake of Louis, Count of Savoy by Anne de Lusignan, daughter of King Janus of Cyprus, and became a King of Cyprus from 1459 to 1462 and also a titular King of Jerusalem.

By her second husband Louis, Charlotte had;
Hugh or Henry, who was born on 4 July 1464 in Rhodes. The boy died within a month of his birth.

Notes

References

Sources

Cypriot monarchs
15th-century women rulers
1444 births
1487 deaths
15th-century Cypriot people
Claimant Kings of Jerusalem
Princesses of Antioch
Queens regnant in Europe
Women of the Crusader states
People from Nicosia
House of Poitiers-Lusignan
Burials at St. Peter's Basilica